Sonic Boom: Rise of Lyric is an action-adventure platform video game developed by Big Red Button and published by Sega for the Wii U. Along with Sonic Boom: Shattered Crystal for the Nintendo 3DS, the game is a spin-off of Sega's Sonic the Hedgehog series and is a part of the Sonic Boom franchise, which also consists of an animated television series (whose games serve as a prequel), a comic series by Archie Comics, and a toyline by Tomy. The game explores on Sonic, Tails, Knuckles and Amy, who must stop Lyric the Last Ancient from acquiring the Chaos Crystals by powering up a robot army and wiping out all organic life, after Sonic accidentally awakens Lyric from a thousand year rest, while escaping Doctor Eggman.

Rise of Lyric and Shattered Crystal both formed the third and final part in Sega's exclusivity agreement with Nintendo, following Sonic Lost World and Mario & Sonic at the Sochi 2014 Olympic Winter Games in 2013. Both games were released in North America, Europe and Australia in November 2014.

Rise of Lyric received negative reviews from critics for its controls, camera system, combat, story, gameplay, dialogue, and numerous bugs and technical issues. The game was also a commercial failure, with the combined sales of Rise of Lyric and Shattered Crystal totaling 620,000 copies by March 31, 2015. Following the failure of Rise of Lyric, Big Red Button had nearly considered shutting down.

Gameplay

Rise of Lyric is an action-adventure game with a stronger emphasis on exploration and combat compared to previous Sonic the Hedgehog installments, featuring four main characters whom players control: Sonic, Tails, Knuckles, and Amy. Each character has their own unique abilities and gameplay mechanics: Sonic can use his speed and homing attacks, Tails can fly and use various gadgets, Knuckles can burrow underground and climb on walls, and Amy can use her hammer to swing on poles. Each character also possesses a whip-like weapon called the Enerbeam, which allows them to perform various actions such as hanging from speeding rails, removing enemy shields, and solving puzzles. There is also a focus on collaboration, with players switching control between multiple characters and using their abilities to progress. The game supports local co-operative multiplayer for two players, with additional modes for up to four players locally.

Rise of Lyric is divided into at least three main gameplay styles: speedy platforming stages similar to main-series Sonic games like Sonic Generations, exploration stages, and boss battles.

Plot
Sonic, Tails, Knuckles, and Amy pursue Doctor Eggman until they encounter an ancient tomb with carvings of Sonic and Tails on the entrance. Sonic is stopped twice by Amy from opening the door, but when Metal Sonic ambushes the group, Sonic opens the door and the group escape. Inside, they encounter an imprisoned, but powerful snake villain named Lyric the Last Ancient. Lyric recognises Sonic from events transpiring one thousand years ago and captures the group, but Tails deactivates the shackles and turns them into beams named Enerbeams for the group to use.

After meeting Cliff, the group discovers that Lyric planned to power an army of war robots with the Chaos Crystals to create a world of twisted metal and robots, but was imprisoned by The Ancients when they discovered the plan; the group then set out to retrieve the Chaos Crystals before Lyric. At an abandoned research facility, they meet MAIA, a robot who rebelled against Lyric, who assists them by creating a portal, allowing Sonic and Tails to go one thousand years back in time to retrieve a map showing the location of the Chaos Crystals. Sonic and Tails are then attacked by Shadow, but defeat him, enter the portal, successfully retrieve the map from inside Lyric's weapon facility and trap him inside for future imprisonment by The Ancients.

Lyric reluctantly forms an alliance with Eggman, but after no success, Lyric turns on Eggman by programming Metal against him. The group defeat Metal and Eggman and retrieve the final Chaos Crystal, but Sonic is then surrounded by Lyric and his robots. Lyric demands the Crystals; Sonic refuses to give them up, but Tails, Knuckles and Amy agree to do so. Sonic is then attacked by Lyric's robots and buried under rubble, but recovers and the group set out to Lyric's lair to stop him. During the battle, Lyric reprogrammes the Enerbeams to ensnare the group, but before he can take advantage of the situation, Eggman ambushes Lyric from behind, freeing the group. Sonic then ties up Lyric with assistance from his friends and removes Lyric's technopathy device to incapacitate him; Knuckles discards it. The group celebrate, but Eggman recovers the device and uses it to revive Metal.

Development
On May 17, 2013, Sega announced a worldwide agreement with Nintendo for the next three games in Sega's Sonic the Hedgehog series to be developed exclusively for Nintendo consoles. This included Sonic Lost World and Mario & Sonic at the Sochi 2014 Olympic Winter Games. On February 6, 2014, Sega announced Sonic Boom as the title for Wii U and Nintendo 3DS. The game ties in with Sega's Sonic Boom franchise, which includes a television series and other merchandise, and is the third release in Sega's exclusivity agreement with Nintendo. The franchise was designed for Western audiences and serves as a prequel to the television series. Sega announced the game would feature Sonic's traditional speed alongside a new exploratory game mechanic called "Enerbeam". Sega of America's marketing director Marchello Churchill explained that the new franchise was not designed to "replace modern Sonic". The Western developer's CEO explained that Sonic Boom Sonic is "very different ... both in tone and art direction". Nintendo Life reported it had a working title of Sonic Synergy.

Los Angeles based game studio Big Red Button developed the game under supervision by Sonic Team and long-time Sonic game designer Takashi Iizuka. The game was built on CryEngine and is centered on "combat and exploration". Sega outsourced the game to Western developers in order to increase the game's appeal in Western markets, culminating in a separate westernized Sonic franchise. The video game concept came after the television series plan. Big Red Button was chosen due to the studio's adventure game portfolio and leader, Bob Rafei of the Crash Bandicoot, Uncharted, and Jak and Daxter series. Portions of the game were co-developed by IllFonic, who assisted with some of the game's level design, art assets, and code. The game remains a separate continuity to the main series, and was originally not intended to be released in Japan. However, it was later revealed that the games would be released in Japan, under the name .

British composer Richard Jacques composed the music. Jacques was selected for his experience with Sonic games including Sonic 3D Blast, Sonic R, and Sonic & All-Stars Racing Transformed.

Release

"Knuckles Jump" glitch
On the first day of release, a glitch was discovered that allowed players to jump to infinite heights by pausing the game during Knuckles' jump, which could be used to bypass most of the game. Speedrunners managed to beat the game in under an hour using the glitch. In January 2015, a patch was released to fix a few problems with the game, including the "Knuckles Jump" glitch.

Reception

Pre-release demos featured at E3 2014 received mostly negative reception from journalists. Destructoid nominated Rise of Lyric for "Best Platformer" and "Best Nintendo Exclusive" for their "Best of E3" awards. In contrast, GameCentral wrote, "the very worst game in the line-up was Sega's Sonic Boom, which was so unspeakably awful we couldn't even force ourselves to play through the whole demo".

Unlike previous games, Sega did not provide reviewers with advance copies of either Shattered Crystal or Rise of Lyric; they could only begin reviewing once the game was set for sale. Rise of Lyric became the lowest-scoring game in the Sonic series and is notable for its exceptionally negative reception from critics. It has a Metacritic score of 32/100 and a GameRankings score of 33.15%. Don Saas from GameSpot panned the game for its repetitive level design, dull puzzle-solving, numerous bugs, and uninspired combat system. He stated that "Through a combination of unwieldy controls, a broken camera system, and a total lack of responsiveness, the platforming and exploration elements of Rise of Lyric are totally unworkable". He summarized the review by saying that the Sonic name deserves better than Rise of Lyric, and so do consumers. Similarly, Tim Turi from Game Informer criticized the poor visual quality, frame rate, dialogue, unfunny jokes, and shoddy level-design.

Mikel Reparaz from IGN was slightly less negative, praising its multiplayer gameplay, but criticizing the game's simple and tedious combat, stating that "Rise of Lyric isn't fundamentally broken or unplayable; it's just thoroughly disappointing and unpolished, and while it does have some fun to offer, it's fun that's been done better in countless similar games. Rise of Lyric falls well below our already-low expectations". Sam Gill of the Independent called its graphics "bland" whilst criticizing its poor gameplay and irritating glitches but praising its soundtrack. He concluded the review by stating while it could be argued the game is primarily aimed at children, it "doesn’t excuse the general lack of quality apparent in this poorly executed piece of software".

David Jenkins from GameCentral was negative about the game, citing a "terrible camera", dull combat, "insipid" level design, "broken" graphics and "serious" bugs. He stated it is "definitely the worst game of 2014". GameCentral was appalled with the E3 demo of the game, and David stated one of the positive things about Sonic Boom is that "it proves previews do give a relatively accurate impression of a game’s final quality".

Sega announced that both Sonic Boom games had sold a combined 620,000 copies as of March 31, 2015, making them one of the lowest-selling in the franchise.

Response to criticism
After the launch of Sonic Boom, former Sega of America producer Stephen Frost gave a number of reasons as to what went wrong with the game. One of which is that based on focus tests, people were "sick and tired" of Sonic going too fast and wanted to slow him down. Frost said that they added too many features in Sonic Boom that bloated the overall experience. He added that if he could do the game again, he would remove features and speed would be the main focus from the start.

Notes

References

External links

2014 video games
3D platform games
Action-adventure games
Asymmetrical multiplayer video games
CryEngine games
Nintendo Network games
Sega video games
Wii U games
Wii U-only games
Wii U eShop games
Video games scored by Richard Jacques
Video games developed in the United States
Video games featuring female protagonists
Single-player video games
Sonic the Hedgehog spin-off games